The Kintla Lake Ranger Station in Glacier National Park is a rustic log structure that was built by the Butte Oil Company in 1900 at Kintla Lake. It was taken over by the National Park Service and used as a ranger station. It is significant as a remnant of early oil exploration activities in the Glacier area. A boathouse was built by the National Park Service in 1935 to the same design as the boathouses at Upper Lake McDonald and Saint Mary ranger stations. A fire cache cabin, identical to those at Logging Creek, Polebridge and Lake McDonald ranger stations was built in 1934.

References

Ranger stations in Glacier National Park (U.S.)
Park buildings and structures on the National Register of Historic Places in Montana
Houses completed in 1900
Log cabins in the United States
Historic districts on the National Register of Historic Places in Montana
Rustic architecture in Montana
National Register of Historic Places in Flathead County, Montana
Log buildings and structures on the National Register of Historic Places in Montana
1900 establishments in Montana
National Register of Historic Places in Glacier National Park
Petroleum in Montana
Petroleum infrastructure in the United States